Frank-Markus Barwasser (born 16 February 1960 in Würzburg) is a German political satirist and journalist. On stage, he almost always acts as the character of Erwin Pelzig, wearing a corduroy hat.

Barwasser grew up in Würzburg, Lower Franconia, Bavaria. After working for the local newspaper, Main-Post, he studied political science, history and ethnology at the Ludwig Maximilian University of Munich and the University of Salamanca. From 1985, he began his career on stage as a satirist. In 1993, he invented the character of Erwin Pelzig, which has been his most popular character ever since.

Until 2013, he was co-host, with colleague Urban Priol, of the satirical ZDF show Neues aus der Anstalt and until 2015 he was host of a talk show for the same channel, "Pelzig hält sich".

Awards
 2020 Dieter Hildebrandt Prize

References

German male journalists
German journalists
German satirists
German cabaret performers
Living people
1960 births
German male writers
University of Salamanca alumni
ZDF people
Bayerischer Rundfunk people